This is a list of corporations based in Winnipeg.

This includes businesses completely owned and operated out of Winnipeg, as well as corporations that have significant operations (manufacturing, etc.) in Winnipeg, such as American-owned companies that base their Canadian division in Winnipeg (as in the case of Lifetouch Canada). Ordered here by broad categories, some corporations may fall into more than one section.

Also included in this list, at the bottom, are companies that were once based in Winnipeg but have since moved, as well as defunct companies that were based in Winnipeg when they were active.

Agribusiness

 Cargill Ltd.
G3 Canada
 Farmers Edge — digital agriculture service
James Richardson & Sons — agribusiness conglomerate
Richardson International — agriculture and food industry company
 MacDon Industries Ltd.
 Monsanto Canada
 Paterson GlobalFoods — agrifoods company
 Ridley Inc. (Canadian office)
Parrish & Heimbecker Ltd.
Versatile — brand of agricultural equipment

Business services and human resources 

Studio Farout - digital marketing, design agency services and website and software development company
Ceridian Canada (payroll) — human resources software and services
Norima Consulting — technology consulting and strategic resourcing
People Corporation — group benefits administration, HR consulting, and retirement services
Sherpa.McKim — digital marketing service, formed by the 2021 amalgamation of Sherpa Marketing and McKim Communications Group

Communications and entertainment
 Aboriginal Peoples Television Network
Buffalo Gal Pictures — independent film and television production company
Canwest Global Communications — defunct media conglomerate
Eagle Vision — independent film and television production company
Farpoint Films — film and television production company
Frantic Films — film, television and commercial services
Les Productions Rivard — independent film and television production company
Manitoba Liquor & Lotteries Corporation (crown corporation)
Merit Motion Pictures — independent documentary film and television production company
True North Sports & Entertainment
Ubisoft Winnipeg — video-games studio

Performance arts 

Manitoba Chamber Orchestra Inc.
Manitoba Opera
Manitoba Theatre for Young People
Prairie Theatre Exchange Inc.
Rainbow Stage — Canada's largest and longest-running outdoor theatre
Royal Winnipeg Ballet — Canada's oldest ballet company
Royal Manitoba Theatre Centre Inc.
School of Contemporary Dancers Inc.
Shakespeare in the Ruins
Theatre Projects Manitoba
Winnipeg Jewish Theatre
Winnipeg Symphony Orchestra
Winnipeg's Contemporary Dancers — Canada's longest continuously-running modern dance company

Finance and insurance 
 Assiniboine Credit Union — credit union 
BCV Asset Management — investment and wealth management service
Canada Life Assurance Company (Canada Life)
 Federated Insurance Company of Canada
Great-West Lifeco
Investors Group
 Manitoba Blue Cross — not-for-profit health benefits provider
Manitoba Public Insurance Corp. (crown corporation)
 Red River Mutual Insurance
Telpay — electronic payment company
Value Partners Investments — develops and manages mutual funds for retail investors
The Wawanesa Mutual Insurance Co.
Wellington-Altus Private Wealth — wealth management service

Food, drink, and hospitality

Aura Hair Group — hair salons
Canad Inns — hotel chain
Chicken Delight — restaurant
Fort Garry Brewing Company — brewery
Half Pints Brewing Company — brewery
Old Dutch Foods (Canadian operations) — snack food manufacturer
Scott-Bathgate Ltd. — foodstuff manufacturer
SkipTheDishes — on-demand food delivery service
Temple Hotels — hotel chain
VJ's Drive Inn — restaurant
Former companies:

A&W — fast-food restaurant founded in Winnipeg; now headquartered in BC.
 Agassiz Brewing — former brewing company
Dickie Dee — ice-cream brand
Kraves Candy Co. — the original makers of Clodhoppers before selling their assets to Brookside Foods in BC.
Salisbury House — restaurant

Healthcare and pharmaceutical
 Apotex Fermentation — biotech
 Cangene Corp. — biotech
Manitoba Blue Cross — not-for-profit health benefits provider

Manufacturing
 Arctic Glacier — packaged-ice manufacturer
 Boeing Canada Technology — Canadian subsidiary of Boeing
 Bristol Aerospace — aerospace manufacturer
 Buhler Industries Inc.
 Crane Plumbing Corporation — defunct bathroom fixtures manufacturer, wholly-owned by the American Crane Co.
Fort Garry Brewing Company
 General Electric (manufacturing testing)
 Kitchen Craft of Canada Ltd. — cabinetwork manufacturer
 McClick Technology Inc.
 Mondetta Clothing Company — casual and sportswear design and manufacturing company
Motor Coach Industries
 NFI Group — manufacturer of transit buses and motorcoaches 
New Flyer Industries — bus manufacturer
Label Source — custom label manufacturer
Nas Digitech N.A — develops and distributes protective film and sticky mats
Old Dutch Foods (Canadian operations) — snack food manufacturer
 Palliser Furniture Ltd. — furniture manufacturer
 Pollard Banknote
 Richlu Manufacturing — workwear manufacturer
 Tough Duck
 Work King Safety
 Scott-Bathgate Ltd. — foodstuff manufacturer
Speedpro — largest sign and image producing company in Canada
Tiber River Naturals — manufacturer and distributor of home, pet, and personal-care products
 Vesta Automation Inc.

Publishing

Arbeiter Ring Publishing — bookstore, specializing in progressive, radical and anarchist literature
Arts Manitoba Publications Inc — publisher of Border Crossings magazine
At Bay Press — tradebook publishing company
Fernwood Publishing — second office (headquartered in Halifax)
Great Plains Publications
iMaQPress Inc. — periodicals publishing services
J. Gordon Shillingford Publishing
McNally Robinson — book retailer
Turnstone Press Ltd. — literary publisher
University of Manitoba Press

Former companies:

Aqua Books — former independent bookstore
Bedside Press
Harlequin Enterprises — book publisher founded in Winnipeg; now headquartered in Toronto
Mondragon Bookstore & Coffeehouse — former political bookstore and vegan cafe

Retail and apparel
 Arctic Co-operatives Limited — cooperative federation
Cabela's (Canadian headquarters) — outdoor recreational equipment retail chain
 Devicelist — wholesaler and retailer
Domo — gasoline retailer
K-Tel
McNally Robinson — book retailer
 The North West Company — multinational grocery and retail company; owner of Northern Stores, NorthMart, Giant Tiger (in Western Canada), Alaska Commercial Co., and Cost-U-Less, none of which are based in Winnipeg.
 Princess Auto
 Red River Co-op — retail cooperative
Stedmans V&S (V&S) — variety discount department store chain, now perminantly closed.
Former companies:

Hudson's Bay Company — retailing; moved headquarters from Winnipeg
Metropolitan Stores — former department store
Mondragon Bookstore & Coffeehouse — former political bookstore and vegan cafe
SAAN — discount department store chain; moved headquarters from Winnipeg and is now defunct

Apparel and jewelry 
Ben Moss Jewellers
 Manitobah Mukluks — mukluk and moccasin manufacturer and distributor
Mondetta Clothing Inc. — casual & sportswear design and manufacturing company
Modern Ambition — business and formalwear
Mondetta Originals — clothing line that renews Mondetta's original collections from the company's early days, particularly its "world flag" collection.
Mondetta Performance Gear (MPG) — activewear
Nygård International — apparel manufacturer and retailer
Richlu Manufacturing — workwear
 Tough Duck
 Work King Safety
Silver Jeans Co. — designer denim company

Technology 
 Bold Commerce — e-commerce technology 
 Ceridian Canada (payroll) — human resources software and services
Exchange Technology Services
FPOM — website for business listings, buy/sell classifieds, and local social-networking
IC Group Inc
On4 Networks Corp.
 Revvo Inc. — business review automation platform
SkipTheDishes — on-demand food delivery service
Tactile Robotics

Transportation 
 Bison Transport
 CentrePort Canada — trimodal inland port
Kivalliq Air — airline
 Perimeter Aviation — airline
Reimer Express
NFI Group — manufacturer of transit buses and motorcoaches 
New Flyer Industries — bus manufacturer

Other businesses/services
Bison Fire Protection — sells, installs, and maintains fire protection equipment
Boyd Autobody and Glass — automotive repair
 Heartland International English School — English-language training and testing institution for international students in Winnipeg and Mississauga
J-CON Civil — civil construction service, particularly for sewer and water projects
 Lifetouch Canada — school photography service
Manitoba Hydro (government-owned) — electric power and natural gas utility company
Centra Gas
Mobile Tech Lab — technology repair store
 Solar EPC Canada — renewable/solar energy
Thompson Dorfman Sweatman LLP — legal firm
TREK Geotechnical — engineering consulting service for geotechnical and water resources applications.

Companies founded or formerly based in Winnipeg
 A&W — fast-food restaurant founded in Winnipeg; now headquartered in BC.
Agassiz Brewing — former brewing company
Agricore United — agribusiness
 Aqua Books — former independent bookstore
Canwest — former media conglomerate
Crane Plumbing Corporation — defunct bathroom fixtures manufacturer, wholly-owned by the American Crane Co.
 Dickie Dee — ice-cream brand
Harlequin Enterprises — book publisher, founded in Winnipeg; now headquartered in Toronto
 Hudson Bay Mining and Smelting Co. Ltd. — mining company
 Hudson's Bay Company — retailing
Ipsos-Reid — research company founded in Winnipeg; now operating as Ipsos in Canada.
Kraves Candy Co. — the original makers of Clodhoppers before selling their assets to Brookside Foods in BC.
Liquid Image Corporation — company that manufactured head-mounted displays.
Louis Dreyfus Group — agribusiness
Manitoba Liquor Control Commission (crown corporation) — former liquor regulator of Manitoba
Manitoba Lotteries Corp. (crown corporation) — former lotteries regulator of Manitoba
 Metropolitan Stores — former department store
Moffat Communications — former cable and broadcasting company
Mondragon Bookstore & Coffeehouse — former political bookstore and vegan cafe
Motor Coach Industries — U.S. bus manufacturing company founded in Winnipeg. (Now owned by New Flyer.)
NewLeaf — former virtual airline and ticket reseller
Canada Safeway — grocer
SAAN — discount department store chain; moved headquarters from Winnipeg and is now defunct
 Salisbury House — restaurant
 United Grain Growers — former agribusiness; became Agricore United
 Videon Cablesystems — former broadcaster
 W Network — broadcaster
 Wardrop Engineering — former civil engineering and engineering consulting firm
Western Canada Lottery Corporation (crown corporation)
Westfair Foods — grocer
Winnipeg Hydro — former hydro-generation and distribution company.

References

 
Corporations
Winnipeg